Xu Jianguo (September 1903 – 4 October 1977) was a Chinese Communist politician, intelligence and security officer, public prosecutor and diplomat. He notably served as director of the Tianjin public security bureau (1949–1952), Chief Prosecutor of the Shanghai People's Prosecuracy and head of political and legal affairs at the East China Bureau of the CCP (1952–1959) and as China's ambassador to Romania (1959–1964) and Albania (1964–1967).

Life
Xu Jianguo was born in Dujiazui, Huangpi District, Hubei Province. His family was poor, so he left home when he was young. At the age of 13, he went to work as an apprentice in the repair workshop of the Anyuan Coal Mine in Jiangxi, and while there he attended lectures at the staff night school hosted by Liu Shaoqi. In the spring of 1922, he joined the Chinese Socialist Youth League and became a member of the Communist Party of China in the same year. From 1922 to 1923, Xu Jianguo participated in three consecutive Anyuan coal strikes led by the Communist Party of China. In 1925, Xu Jianguo was sent to Xiangtan by the Hunan Special Commission of the Communist Party of China to form an industrial trade union. He served as the chairman of the southern joint trade union of Xiangtan County, a member of the county trade union and the head of the picket department. In July 1929, he was arrested by the detective team of the Qingxiang Command of Hunan Province after being betrayed by a traitor and sentenced to 7 years in prison. In late July 1930, the Third Red Army conquered Changsha. Xu Jianguo was rescued from the Changsha Army Prison and joined the Chinese Red Army. He studied at the Red Army School and the Central Party School and took part in the Long March. After arriving in Yan'an, he also studied at the Counter-Japanese Military and Political University.

In early 1938, he served as a member of the CPC Central Committee's Security Committee and head of the Security Department. On February 18, 1939, the Central Social Affairs Department (SAD) was established and Xu served as deputy director. In 1942, the Jinchaji Border District Government established the Public Security Management Office, with Xu serving as the director. In August 1945, the Eighth Route Army occupied Zhangjiakou and Xu served as the director of the Municipal Public Security Bureau. 

During the Chinese Civil War, he served as a member of the Standing Committee of the Jinchaji Central Bureau of the Communist Party of China and the North China Bureau of the Central Committee of the Communist Party of China, and head of the Public Security Department of the North China People's Government. 

Tianjin was occupied by the People's Liberation Army on January 15, 1949, and Xu Jianguo served as a member of the Political and Legal Committee of the CPC Central Committee, a member of the Standing Committee of the Tianjin Municipal Committee of the CPC, and the Deputy Mayor of Tianjin and Director of the Public Security Bureau.

Beginning in January 1952, he served in the East China Military and Political Committee as Chief Prosecutor of the Shanghai People's Prosecuracy and head of political and legal affairs at the East China Bureau of the CCP. In 1956, he also became secretary of the Secretariat of the Shanghai Municipal Committee of the Communist Party of China, in charge of political and legal affairs, party and masses, and international affairs. 

The Minister of Foreign Affairs Chen Yi recommended to the Central Committee to transfer Xu to diplomatic work, and in 1959 Xu Jianguo succeeded Ke Bainian as the ambassador of the People’s Republic of China to Romania. 

In 1964 he served as the ambassador of the People's Republic of China to Albania. In May 1966, Xu Jianguo accompanied the Chairman of the Albanian Council of Ministers Mehmet Shehu in his visit to China.

Defined as a traitor during the Cultural Revolution , he was imprisoned in Beijing Qincheng Prison. In May 1975, he was released and sent to Anhui Province to be hospitalized in Lu'an District Hospital. In early 1977, he suffered from lung cancer. He died of illness on October 4, 1977 in Hefei, Anhui. 

His memory was completely rehabilitated in March 1980.

1903 births
1977 deaths
Ambassadors of China to Romania
Ambassadors of China to Albania
Prisoners and detainees of China
Chinese prisoners and detainees
Deaths from cancer in the People's Republic of China
Deaths from lung cancer
Politicians from Wuhan
Chinese Communist Party politicians from Hubei
People's Republic of China politicians from Hubei
Chinese police officers
Victims of the Cultural Revolution